Julia Rayner is a British actress, who has appeared in The Pianist (2002), Topsy-Turvy (1999) and The Gift (1998).

Films
The Gift (1998)
Topsy-Turvy (1999)
The Pianist as Regina Szpilman

References

Living people
20th-century British actresses
21st-century British actresses
Year of birth missing (living people)
Place of birth missing (living people)